Prior to Jorge Bergoglio taking the papal name of Pope Francis, Bergoglio as a cardinal strongly opposed same-sex marriage and the same-sex marriage bill that Argentina senate debated in 2010 but he supported civil unions for gay couples. As Pope Francis, after his election in 2013, he has repeatedly spoken about the need for the Catholic Church to welcome and love all people regardless of sexual orientation. However, Pope Francis has also had gestures in the opposite direction, such as blessing a gay couple in July 2015 to later have Ciro Benedettini, the Vatican Spokesperson, asserting that in no way is the letter "meant to endorse behaviors and teachings unfit to the Gospel". Pope Francis also met with Kim Davis (a county clerk who defied a U.S. federal court order to issue marriage licenses to same-sex couples), to which later the Vatican clarified that this meeting "does not endorse Davis's views."

Speaking about gay people in 2013, Pope Francis said, "the key is for the church to welcome, not exclude, and show mercy, not condemnation." He said, "If a person is gay and seeks God and has good will, who am I to judge?" "The problem", he continued, "is not having this orientation. We must be brothers". The pope has reiterated the Catholic Church's teaching on homosexuality, including its position on marriage.  He has also been outspoken on the need to be compassionate towards LGBT+ people, and was named the Person of the Year by the LGBT magazine The Advocate. In 2019, Pope Francis reiterated that Catholic teaching states that homosexual tendencies "are not a sin".

In the documentary Francesco, which was released in October 2020, Pope Francis expressed support for same-sex civil unions. The pope said that "homosexuals have a right to be a part of the family. [...] They're children of God and have a right to a family. Nobody should be thrown out, or be made miserable because of it." He voiced support for same-sex civil union laws again in September 2021, saying "if they want to spend their lives together, a homosexual couple, nations have the possibility civilly to support them, to give them safety with regards to inheritance and health."

In February 2023, Pope Francis said, that criminalization of same-sexual acts in several countries in Africa and Asia is wrong, a sin and an injustice.

Archbishop of Buenos Aires
Before he became pope and while serving as Archbishop of Buenos Aires, Cardinal Jorge Mario Bergoglio reportedly privately urged his fellow Argentine bishops in 2010 to signal the Church's public support for civil unions, as a compromise response to calls for same-sex marriage. Fellow bishops rejected the idea.  Other sources both support and deny this account.  At that time  Argentina already permitted civil unions, and was debating a bill to allow same-sex couples to marry and adopt children.

On June 22, 2010, in a letter to the Carmelite Nuns of Buenos Aires, Bergoglio had very strong language against the bill, mentioning that "what is at stake here is the identity and survival of the family", pointing out that "here also is the envy of the Devil, by which sin entered into the world, which cunningly seeks to destroy the image of God" with respect to gay marriage. In that same letter, Bergoglio urged not to "be naïve", since the bill was not "a simple political struggle [but] [...] the destructive attempt toward God's plan" and "a 'movement' of the father of lies". Finally, Bergoglio closes the letter asking the Carmelite Nuns for prayers so that senators voting for the bill were not "moved by error or by situations of opportunity, but according to the natural law and the law that God points out to them" and so that they did "the greater good for the country".

Publicly, Bergoglio strongly opposed the bill, warning it could lead to a situation that could "seriously harm the family" and deprive children of the developmental supports of both their father and mother.  After L'Osservatore Romano reported this, several priests expressed their support for the law and one was defrocked. Observers believe that the church's opposition and Bergoglio's language worked in favor of the law's passage and that in response, Catholic officials adopted a more conciliatory tone in later debates on social issues such as parental surrogacy.

In a 2010 book written with Rabbi Abraham Skorka, Bergoglio also spoke of same-sex marriage as "a weakening of the institution of marriage, an institution that has existed for thousands of years and is 'forged according to nature and anthropology.

On the need to welcome LGBT people
Pope Francis has repeatedly spoken about the need for the church to welcome and love all people, regardless of their sexual orientation.  Speaking about gay people in 2013, he said that "the key is for the church to welcome, not exclude and show mercy, not condemnation." In July of that year, he said "If someone is gay and is searching for the Lord and has good will, then who am I to judge him? The Catechism of the Catholic Church explains this in a beautiful way, saying [...]: 'no one should marginalize these people for this, they must be integrated into society.

Several LGBT groups welcomed the comments, noting that this was the first time a pope had used the word "gay" in public, and had also accepted the existence of gay people as a recognizable part of the Catholic Church community. In October 2016, Francis said that "When a person [who is gay] arrives before Jesus, Jesus certainly will not say, 'Go away because you are homosexual.

According to two gay rights activists, Marcelo Márquez and Andrés Albertsen, Bergoglio expressed support for the spiritual needs of "homosexual people" and willingness to support "measured actions" on their behalf in private conversations with them.

In April 2018 Pope Francis met with Juan Carlos Cruz, a survivor of sexual abuse by Chilean priest Fernando Karadima. Cruz discussed with Francis in detail how his sexual orientation was used by Latin American media and news outlets to discredit his report of abuse and label him as a pervert and liar. In a private conversation between the two, Francis reportedly said to Cruz, who identifies as homosexual, in regards to his sexuality, "You know Juan Carlos, that does not matter. God made you like this. God loves you like this. The Pope loves you like this and you should love yourself and not worry about what people say."

These remarks have been seen as an encouraging change of tone from the papacy, so much so that the American LGBT magazine The Advocate named Pope Francis their Person of the Year for 2013.

In a press statement issued on 27 August 2018, Pope Francis declared that homosexuality is not an illness.

In September 2020 Pope Francis told some 40 Italian parents of LGBT children in a brief encounter that "God loves their children as they are" and that "the church loves their children as they are because they are children of God."

In a January 2023 interview with the Associated Press, Pope Francis condemned "unjust" laws that criminalize homosexuality and said the Catholic Church should do more to oppose such laws. He called on bishops who support laws criminalizing homosexuality to undergo a "process of conversion" and to do more to welcome LGBT people into the church. Francis was asked by the Catholic media Outreach to clarify his position after this interview, due to the fact that in said interview Francis had implied being homosexual was a sin. The pope responded to its editor James Martin, in a 27 January a letter, in which the pope stated among other things: "When I said it is a sin, I was simply referring to Catholic moral teaching, which says that every sexual act outside of marriage is a sin".

Defending Catholic teaching on sexual orientation

When speaking to Spanish journalist Jordi Evole on April 1, 2019, Pope Francis noted how Catholic teaching states that homosexual "tendencies are not sin. If you have a tendency to anger, it's not a sin. Now, if you are angry and hurt people, the sin is there." When Evole asked if it was a "rarity" to parents to have a homosexual child, the Pope stated "In theory no [...] But I'm talking about a person who is developing, and parents start to see strange things [...] Please consult, and go to a professional, and there you will see what it is and may not be homosexual, that is due to something else."

Televised meeting with Stephen K. Amos 
On April 19, 2019, Pope Francis appeared on the last episode of the BBC2 three-episode miniseries Pilgrimage: The Road to Rome, which featured eight celebrities as they traveled a section of the Via Francigena, the ancient pilgrimage route from Canterbury to Rome. In this episode, he met with gay comedian Stephen K. Amos—who was one of the show's participants—and told him that with regards to his sexual orientation: "it doesn't matter who you are or how you live your life, you do not lose your dignity".

LGBT families and children
On 26 August 2018, in the plane in the return journey from Ireland to Rome, Pope Francis said that homosexual people existed in the whole history of humankind.  He also said Catholic parents should talk with their homosexual children and that they should not be "throw[n] out" of the family. In the retranscription of the Pope's statement the following day, the sentence "When it [homosexuality] shows itself from childhood, there is a lot that can be done through psychiatry, to see how things are. It is something else if it shows itself after 20 years" was removed from the official transcription; an official from the Vatican stated it was done in order not to change "the thoughts of the Holy Father".

Francis has also spoken of the importance of education in the context of the difficulties now facing children, indicating that the Church had a challenge in not being welcoming enough of children brought up in a multiplicity of household arrangements, specifically including the children of gay couples. He mentioned as an example a case of a child with a mother living in a lesbian relationship: 
"I remember the case of a very sad little girl who finally confided to her teacher the reason for her state of mind: 'my mother's fiancée doesn't like me'. [...] How can we proclaim Christ to these boys and girls? How can we proclaim Christ to a generation that is changing? We must be careful not to administer a vaccine against faith to them."

After Italian tabloids suggested his comments indicated a shift towards accepting civil unions for gay couples, the Director of the Holy See Press Office said the pope was talking only about the difficulties of children in non-traditional families, not making a declaration on the debate in Italy concerning gay unions.

Teaching on marriage
Francis has taught that "Marriage is between a man and a woman. Secular states want to justify civil unions to regulate different situations of cohabitation, pushed by the demand to regulate economic aspects between persons, such as ensuring health care. It is about pacts of cohabitating of various natures, of which I wouldn't know how to list the different ways. One needs to see the different cases and evaluate them in their variety." Some interpreted this as suggesting that the Catholic Church could tolerate some types of non-marital civil unions, but the Vatican later clarified that was not Francis' intention.

In February 2015, Francis encouraged people in Slovakia, who were considering limiting marriage to opposite sex couples, to "continue their efforts in defense of the family, the vital cell of society." At the start of 2014, Bishop Charles J. Scicluna of Malta reported that in a private conversation held with Pope Francis in December 2013, the pope said that gay marriage was "an anthropological regression."

The New York Times considers that Bergoglio may have supported gay unions in Argentina only as a negotiated compromise, but that his context as a Pope is very different. In 2015, Pope Francis declared that "the family is threatened by growing efforts on the part of some to redefine the very institution of marriage" and suggested that same-sex marriage "disfigures God's plan for creation."

Civil unions 
In an earlier 2019 interview for the Mexican broadcaster Televisa, the pope endorsed for same-sex couples "convivencia civil" (in Spanish); this remark aired only later for the film Francesco in October 2020 in which the expression was translated to "civil union" in the subtitles of the film. This has been picked up by the media as Pope Francis supporting same-sex civil union. Some Spanish-speaking Catholic priests said the translation was inaccurate. Archbishop Víctor Manuel Fernández of La Plata, long-time theological advisor of Pope Francis, has defended that the two expressions "unión civil" and "ley de convivencia civil" are often used interchangeably in Argentina when speaking about laws, and designate a civil union.

The film Francesco uses three different passages of the original interview from February 2019, only two of which aired in May on the Mexican channel: "Homosexuals have a right to be a part of the family." "They are children of God and have the right to a family. Nobody should be thrown out or be made miserable because of it". "What we have to create is a civil union law. That way they are legally covered. I stood up for that." The last passages had been cut from public releases at the time. However, Vatican later stated that his comments were taken out of context with two comments to two different questions at different times spliced together in a very misleading way.

In September 2021, Pope Francis expressed support for same-sex civil unions, saying that "same-sex civil unions are good and helpful to many".

Amoris Laetitia
Francis presided over the 2014 Synod on the Family, the first assembly of the Synod to explicitly examine the issue of pastoral care for people in same-sex civil unions and marriages. The synod's working document called for less judgment towards people that are gay and more understanding towards same-sex couples in civil unions or marriages, as well as an equal welcome for children of such couples (including conferring baptism), while still rejecting the validity of same-sex marriage itself. However, the final report failed to contain the proposed language as it did not receive the necessary two-thirds support of attending bishops.

In the post-synodal apostolic exhortation  Amoris Laetitia, issued in 2016, Francis encouraged better understanding from all members of the church on the acceptance of gay people, without suggesting any specific doctrinal changes. Instead, he reiterated the need for every person to be respected regardless of their sexual orientation, and to be free from threats of aggression and violence. He avoided any recognition of unions between same sex couples, but rather maintained that these were not equal to heterosexual unions. Some parts of the media interpreted his remarks as more moderate on the issue of homosexuality than that taken by church leaders in previous years.

Transgender issues, gender theory

Francis supports transgender Catholics inclusion in the Church, but calls gender transitioning a sin and strongly criticizes gender theory, comparing it to nuclear arms.

On 2 October 2016, Pope Francis spoke in favor of pastoral care for and including transgender Catholics in the church, stating priests should "accompany them spiritually" and that they should never be turned away, even if they have undergone sex transition and sex-reassignment operations. He spoke out against "gender theory"—the idea that "denies the difference and reciprocity in nature of a man and a woman and envisages a society without sexual differences, thereby eliminating the anthropological basis of the family"—being taught in schools.  He referred to it as "ideological colonization" and said it was a threat to traditional marriage and is destructive to children. New Ways Ministry and DignityUSA, two dissenting LGBT Catholic advocacy groups, both spoke out against Pope Francis's statements regarding gender identity, calling it "dangerous ignorance" of the issue.

Francis once held an audience with a Spanish transgender man, who had transitioned from female to male, and his wife.

Pope Francis in April 2020 was also welcoming and assisting Latin American transgender prostitutes who because of COVID-19 pandemic no longer had "customers on the street".

In August 2020 Pope Francis encouraged the Argentinian Carmelite nun Sister Mónica Astorga Cremona who opened a safe home for transgender women despite the opposition of her diocese and community, described as the first permanent residence in the world dedicated to vulnerable transgender people. He reportedly told her that transgender people are "the lepers of today". Francis also sent a hand-written note to Cremona: "God, who didn't attend seminary and didn't study theology, will reward you generously. I pray for you and your daughters". Michael Coren described the move as "Pope Francis's monumental support of trans community".

Gay clergy

In the 2018 book The Strength of a Vocation, Pope Francis is quoted as saying that gay clergy "is a very serious issue" that "influences the life of the church" and is therefore something he is "concerned about".  He further goes on to say "In consecrated and priestly life, there's no room for that kind of affection. Therefore, the church recommends that people with that kind of ingrained tendency should not be accepted into the ministry or consecrated life." Pope Francis expanded on this in an interview in December 2018, suggesting that gay priests must commit to the same standards of celibacy as their heterosexual counterparts.

Other

During his 2015 visit to the United States, Francis held a private meeting with Kim Davis, a county clerk from Kentucky who had gained international attention after defying a federal court order requiring that she issue marriage licenses to same-sex couples. The Vatican press office shortly after issued a statement saying that the pope was unaware of her situation and the meeting was not to be considered an endorsement. The only audience given by Francis while in Washington was with an Argentine former student, Yayo Grassi, who is openly gay, and his same-sex partner of 19 years.

Francis has suggested that he believed a "gay lobby" existed within the Vatican itself, in remarks during a meeting held in private with Catholic religious from Latin America in 2013. He was reported to have promised to see what could be done to address the issue.

In October 2015, priest and Vatican theologian Krzysztof Charamsa was stripped of his posts after announcing he was in a homosexual relationship.

In relation to reports that a Vatican official whom he had recently promoted had had a homosexual relationship, the pope drew a distinction between sins, which can be forgiven if repented of, and crimes, such as sexual abuse of minors.

In May 2022 James J. Martin sent three questions to the Pope about the relation of the LGBT community with the Church. The Pope answered the three questions, declaring that God "does not disown any of his children", advising LGBT people to read the Acts of the Apostles to "find the image of the living Church", and explaining that some LGBT Catholics suffered not 'rejection of the church' itself but instead rejection by 'people in the church'. He additionally praised the work of Martin.

References

External links
 'This is Pope Francis calling...' The Tablet. Archived.

Francis
Catholic theology and doctrine
Catholic theology of the body
LGBT history
Homosexuality